Andrzej Ryszard Piątkowski (22 October 1934 – 11 June 2010) was a Polish sabreur who won three medals at the 1956, 1960 and 1964 Summer Olympics.

References

External links 
 Zmarł Andrzej Piątkowski

1934 births
2010 deaths
Polish male fencers
Olympic fencers of Poland
Fencers at the 1956 Summer Olympics
Fencers at the 1960 Summer Olympics
Fencers at the 1964 Summer Olympics
Olympic bronze medalists for Poland
Olympic silver medalists for Poland
Olympic medalists in fencing
Fencers from Warsaw
Medalists at the 1956 Summer Olympics
Medalists at the 1960 Summer Olympics
Medalists at the 1964 Summer Olympics
20th-century Polish people
21st-century Polish people